Álvaro de Arriba López (born 2 June 1994 in Salamanca) is a Spanish middle-distance runner specialising in the 800 metres. He represented his country at the 2016 World Indoor Championships without qualifying for the final. He won bronze at the 2017 European Athletics Indoor Championships in Belgrade with a time of 1:49.68.

His personal bests in the event are 1:44.85 outdoors (Chorzów 2022) and 1:45.43 indoors (Salamanca 2018).

Competition record

References

External links 
 

1994 births
Living people
Spanish male middle-distance runners
Sportspeople from Salamanca
Athletes (track and field) at the 2016 Summer Olympics
Olympic athletes of Spain
World Athletics Championships athletes for Spain
Athletes (track and field) at the 2018 Mediterranean Games
Mediterranean Games gold medalists for Spain
Mediterranean Games medalists in athletics
Mediterranean Games gold medalists in athletics
European Athletics Indoor Championships winners
21st-century Spanish people